Sabaneta is a station on line A of the Medellín Metro going south. The station was opened on 17 September 2012 as part of the extension of the line from Itagüí to La Estrella. This station is known for having a more modern appearance than the other stations.

References

External links
 Official site of Medellín Metro 

Medellín Metro stations
Railway stations opened in 2012
2012 establishments in Colombia